Édson Bastos Barreto  or simply  Édson Bastos  (born 3 November 1979 in Foz do Iguaçu), is a Brazilian goalkeeper who plays for Foz do Iguaçu Futebol Clube.

Honours
Figueirense
 Santa Catarina State Championship: 2002, 2003, 2004

Coritiba
 Brazilian Série B: 2007, 2010
 Paraná State Championship: 2008, 2010, 2011, 2012

References

External links
 websoccer
 sambafoot
http://futpedia.globo.com/jogadores/edson-bastos
http://www.cbf.com.br/php/registro.php?i=140911

1979 births
Living people
Brazilian footballers
Figueirense FC players
Fortaleza Esporte Clube players
Coritiba Foot Ball Club players
Associação Atlética Ponte Preta players
Campeonato Brasileiro Série A players
Association football goalkeepers
People from Foz do Iguaçu
Sportspeople from Paraná (state)